ENOC (an acronym for) is the fourth studio album by Puerto Rican reggaeton singer Ozuna. It was released through Aura Music and Sony Music Latin on September 4, 2020. The album was supported by six singles: "Caramelo", "Gistro Amarillo", "Enemigos Ocultos", "Despeinada", "No Se Da Cuenta", and "Del Mar". The album's guest features include Myke Towers, Karol G, Daddy Yankee, Doja Cat, Sia, Camilo, and J Balvin.

Commercial performance 
In United States, ENOC debuted at number 17 on the US Billboard 200 and at number one on the Billboard Top Latin Albums chart, with 21,000 album-equivalent units.

Track listing

Charts

Weekly charts

Year-end charts

Certifications

References 

2020 albums
Ozuna (singer) albums
Spanish-language albums